The Capital Region of Denmark is the easternmost administrative region of Denmark. The Capital Region has 29 municipalities and a regional council consisting of 41 elected members. As of 1 August 2021 the chairperson is Lars Gaardhøj, who is a member of the Social Democrats party of Denmark.

The Capital Region was established on 1 January 2007 as part of the 2007 Danish Municipal Reform. This reform abolished the traditional counties (Danish plural: ,) and created five regions. As part of this reform 271 smaller municipalities were merged into larger units reducing the number of municipalities to 98.

The reform dramatically diminished the power of regional governments while enhancing that of local government and that of the central government in Copenhagen. It was implemented on 1 January 2007.

Unlike the former counties (1970–2006) (Danish , literally 'county municipality') the regions are not municipalities and are thus not allowed to have a coat of arms, only logotypes.

The regions do not collect taxes and are financed primarily through block grants, they are unable to transfer money from one area of expenditure to another, and they must return any unused money to the central government. This makes the regions more like departments or agencies of the central government.

The main industries in the region are hospitals and healthcare.
 
The Capital Region is not to be confused with the Copenhagen Metropolitan Area or the Øresund Region.

Overview

The Capital Region of Denmark is one of five regions in Denmark and consists of the municipalities of Copenhagen and Frederiksberg, the former counties of Copenhagen and Frederiksborg, and the regional municipality of Bornholm. It borders Zealand and Sweden's Skåne County via the Øresund Bridge.

Denmark's largest lake (Danish ), Arresø, lies 43 kilometers (28 miles) northwest of Copenhagen. There are several other lakes, the deepest in Denmark being Furesø, 14.5 km (9 miles) northwest of Copenhagen, which is the namesake of the Furesø Municipality. Among several forests, the region also has the Gribskov forest, which is the namesake of the Gribskov Municipality. The Dyrehaven forest park is just north of Copenhagen (and east of Furesø) in Gentofte Municipality and Lyngby-Taarbæk Municipality.

Geologically, the region lies in the northern part of Denmark, which is rising because of post-glacial rebound, making lakes out of former inlets and bays. Arresø is one example, having extended in a northwesterly direction as a part of Brødemose Sund into Kattegat. Because of the mobility of the sand dunes, forests have been planted along the coast of Kattegat in the municipalities of Helsingør, Gribskov, and Halsnæs.

For the purpose of a road and rail connection to Øresund Bridge, land has been added to the island of Amager, which has a tunnel connecting it with the artificial island Peberholm just south of the island of Saltholm. The land area of east Denmark (east of the Great Belt strait) is approximately 9,622 km2 (3,715 sq mi), which is set to increase due to housing projects in the north of Copenhagen Municipality, and also due to new bridges and tunnels being added, including the Fehmarn Belt Fixed Link and other traffic infrastructure projects. A new high-speed train line called the Copenhagen-Ringsted Line came into operation on 1 June 2019 to increase transport capacity and relieve congestion in Roskilde and the narrow 9-9.5 mile isthmus between Roskilde Fjord and the bay of Køge Bugt. It does this by moving international and national train traffic to the new train line and only keeping local and regional traffic.

The primary function and largest expenditure, which takes up around 90% of the budget of the Capital Region, is owning and operating the hospitals and health services of the region.

In the east of Denmark, there is one traffic region covered by the public transport agency Movia, which is owned by the Capital Region of Denmark and Region Zealand, and operates in 45 of the 46 municipalities. Because of its remote location, Bornholm has its own traffic company, also known as BAT.

Likewise, in the east of Denmark, the two regions and 45 of the 46 municipalities make up one sole employment region, with Bornholm being its own employment region. Bornholm also performs other tasks that are normally performed by the regions in the rest of Denmark. The municipality of Bornholm is therefore called Bornholm Regional Municipality. In some respects, the island forms a region of its own.

As Denmark is a unitary state, its "capital region" is not a capital district, but merely one among several regions of Denmark that happens to contain the national capital.

The region does not include the Ertholmene archipelago which is situated to the northeast of Bornholm.

Economy 
The gross domestic product (GDP) of the region was €122.2 billion in 2018, accounting for 40.6% of Denmark's economic output. GDP per capita, adjusted for purchasing power, was €50,000  or 166% of the EU27 average in the same year. GDP per person employed was 130% of the EU27 average. The Capital Region is the wealthiest region in Denmark.

Hospitals
The Capital Region of Denmark also manages several hospitals:
 Amager Hospital on the island of Amager, Copenhagen
 Bispebjerg Hospital in Copenhagen
 Bornholms Hospital on the island of Bornholm
 Frederiksberg Hospital (closing in 2025, moving to Bispebjerg) in Frederiksberg
 Gentofte Hospital in Gentofte
 Glostrup Hospital in Glostrup
 Herlev Hospital in Herlev
 Hvidovre Hospital in Hvidovre
 Nordsjællands Hospital in Esbønderup, Frederikssund, Hillerød, Elsinore, and Hørsholm
 Region Hovedstadens Psykiatri – psychiatric hospital with many centers around the region
 Rigshospitalet in Copenhagen
 Sct. Hans Hospital in Roskilde

Municipalities of the Capital Region

There are 29 municipalities in the Capital Region of Denmark.

 Copenhagen 
 Frederiksberg
 Albertslund 
 Allerød
 Ballerup 
 Bornholm
 Brøndby 
 Dragør
 Egedal
 Fredensborg
 Frederikssund
 Furesø
 Gentofte 
 Gladsaxe 
 Glostrup 
 Gribskov
 Halsnæs
 Helsingør
 Herlev 
 Hillerød 
 Hørsholm
 Høje-Taastrup
 Hvidovre 
 Ishøj 
 Lyngby-Taarbæk 
 Rudersdal
 Rødovre 
 Tårnby 
 Vallensbæk

Regional council
The five regions of Denmark each have a regional council of 41 members. Members are elected every four years during local elections.

See also 
Regions of Denmark
Municipalities of Denmark
North Zealand

References

External links

 

 
States and territories established in 2007
Regions of Denmark
2007 establishments in Denmark